
Gmina Dębno is a rural gmina (administrative district) in Brzesko County, Lesser Poland Voivodeship, in southern Poland.

Villages
Gmina Dębno contains the villages and settlements of Biadoliny Szlacheckie, Dębno, Doły, Jastew, Jaworsko, Łoniowa, Łysa Góra, Maszkienice, Niedźwiedza, Perła, Porąbka Uszewska, Sufczyn and Wola Dębińska.

Neighbouring gminas
Gmina Dębno is bordered by the gminas of Borzęcin, Brzesko, Czchów, Gnojnik, Wojnicz and Zakliczyn.

References
Polish official population figures 2006

Debno
Brzesko County